Young-Tae Chang is a South Korean chemist. He is a professor of chemistry at Pohang University of Science and Technology (POSTECH) and Associate Director under Kim Kimoon at the Center for Self-assembly and Complexity at the Institute for Basic Science located on the POSTECH campus.

Young-Tae Chang was born in Pusan, South Korea in 1968. He obtained a Bachelor of Science degree in chemistry from POSTECH, working on the divergent synthesis of all regioisomers of myo-inositol phosphates, under guide of Prof. Sung-Kee Chung. Doctoral requirements at POSTECH require a student study at least three years, but Young-Tae finished in two, requiring his advisor to appeal for a revision of the rules which allowed him to receive his doctorate in February 1997. He then engaged in postdoctoral research in the laboratory of Prof. Peter G. Schultz at University of California, Berkeley and Scripps Research in 2000.

He was appointed assistant professor at New York University (NYU) and promoted to associated professor in 2005.  In September 2007, he moved to the National University of
Singapore and the Singapore Bioimaging Consortium at Biopolis. From 2017, he is a Full Professor in the Department of Chemistry, POSTECH and head of the Laboratory of Bioimaging Probe Development at SBIC. He pioneered diversity-oriented fluorescence library approach (DOFLA), and developed embryonic stem cell probe CDy1, neuronal stem cell probe CDr3, and neron specific probe, NeuO. He also developed a method for background-free live cell imaging with tamed fluorescent probe.

He is an editorial board member of MedChemComm and RSC Advances, Royal Society of Chemistry, and American Journal of Nuclear Medicine and Molecular Imaging. He has published more than 300 scientific papers and 3 books resulting in more than 22,000 citations. Additionally, he has filed more than 50 patents.

Honors and awards 
 2023: Yoshida Prize, International Organic Chemistry Foundation
 2022: Sang-Chul Shim Academic Award, Korean Chemical Society
 2007: NUS Young Investigator Award
 2005: Career Award, National Science Foundation

References

External links 
 Professor CHANG Young-Tae, POSTECH
 Associate Director - Center for Self-assembly and Complexity
 Young-Tae Chang - Google Scholar

Living people
1968 births
Institute for Basic Science
Academic staff of the National University of Singapore
Organic chemists
Pohang University of Science and Technology alumni
Academic staff of Pohang University of Science and Technology
South Korean chemists